Giakoumakis is a Greek surname that may refer to:

Georgios Giakoumakis (born 1959), Greek naval officer 
Giorgos Giakoumakis (born 1994), Greek footballer
Petros Giakoumakis (born 1992), Greek footballer 

Greek-language surnames
Surnames